Area 44 may refer to

 Municipal District of Rocky View No. 44, now named Rocky View County, Alberta
 Brodmann area 44, or BA44, part of the frontal cortex in the human brain